Rebecca Rayne Holloway (born 25 August 1995) is a professional footballer who plays as a defender for National Women's Soccer League club Racing Louisville and the Northern Ireland national team.

Early life 
Born in Nailsea, North Somerset, Holloway started playing football at the age of five for local side Nailsea Boys before moving on to Clevedon Town and eventually Bristol City Academy where she was coached by future England manager Mark Sampson.

Cumberland Phoenix 
In 2015, Holloway moved to the United States to study and play college soccer at Cumberland University. She played four seasons for NAIA team Cumberland Phoenix, notably earning Mid-South Conference First-Team selection in three straight years and was named back to back Mid-South Conference Player of the Year in 2017 and 2018. As a senior, Holloway led the league in goals with 22.

Club career

Nashville Rhythm 
In 2019, Holloway played for semi-professional WPSL team Nashville Rhythm. She made 11 appearances, scoring one goal as Nashville finished second in the Southeast Conference.

Birmingham City 
On 24 July 2019, Holloway returned to England to sign with FA WSL team Birmingham City. On 19 July 2021, Holloway signed a contract extension at Birmingham for the 2021–22 season.

Racing Louisville 
On 31 March 2022, Racing Louisville paid a transfer fee to purchase Holloway, signing her to a two-year contract.

International career 
Holloway represented Northern Ireland at under-19 level. She received several invitations to senior women's squad training camps, however her studies in the USA prevented her from attending.

In August 2019, Holloway was named to the senior team for UEFA Euro 2021 qualifying matches against Norway and Wales but was an unused substitute in both. Having removed herself from the national team fold to focus on her mental health, Holloway eventually made her senior international debut on 9 April 2021, against Ukraine in the UEFA Women's Euro 2022 qualifying play-offs. She played the full 90 minutes of both legs stepping in for injured long-term left-back Demi Vance as Northern Ireland won 4–1 on aggregate, qualifying the team for UEFA Women's Euro 2022. It was the first time Northern Ireland had qualified for a major international tournament.

Career statistics

College 

Source

Club 
.

International
Statistics accurate as of match played 23 February 2022.

International goals
 As of match played 29 November 2021. Northern Ireland score listed first, score column indicates score after each Holloway goal.

Honors

College
Cumberland Phoenix
Mid-South Conference Regular Season Champions: 2017

Individual
Mid-South Conference Player of the Year: 2017, 2018

References

External links 
 Profile at Birmingham City
 

1995 births
Living people
English women's footballers
Women's association footballers from Northern Ireland
Birmingham City W.F.C. players
Women's Super League players
Women's association football midfielders
People from Nailsea
UEFA Women's Euro 2022 players
Northern Ireland women's international footballers
National Women's Soccer League players